Going Viral, Goes Viral, Go Viral, Gone Viral, or variant, may refer to:

 Viral phenomenon, a pop cultural phenomenon
 Going Viral (2019 documentary), company documentary to the 2019 mini-series The Hot Zone
 Going Viral (2013 book) by Karine Nahon
 Going Viral: Zombies, Viruses, and the End of the World (2018 book) by Dahlia Schweitzer
 "Going Viral" (2014 TV episode) season 2 episode 5 of The Face, see The Face (U.S. season 2)
 "Going Viral", Part 1 and Part 2 (2012 TV episodes) a pair of season 2 episodes of Body of Proof, see Body of Proof (season 2)
 Going Viral (dance) a performance dance created by  Nathan Andary and Jane Wang
 Gone Viral TV, Barbaduan TV channel

See also

 Viral (disambiguation)